Orchestral Pop Noir Romantique is an EP by The Dears, originally released in 2001 on the now defunct Shipbuilding Records, and later licensed to Universal Music Canada.

Track listing
 "Heathrow or Deathrow" – 4:22
 "Autotomy" – 5:21
 "No Return" – 6:15
 "Acoustic Guitar Phase" – 5:39

Year-end charts

References 

The Dears albums
2001 EPs